Mickey Brady (born 7 October 1950) is an Irish republican politician who has been the Member of Parliament (MP) for Newry and Armagh since 2015.  He was previously a Member of the Legislative Assembly of Northern Ireland for Newry and Armagh from 2007 to 2015.

Early life 
Brady was born in the Ballybot area of Newry. He attended the Abbey Primary School in the town and later the Abbey Christian Brothers' Grammar School. After this, he went to university in Liverpool. In 1981, Brady was employed by the Confederation of Community Groups in Newry, running a welfare rights advice centre, dealing with benefits and housing issues until 2007. His mother, Sarah "Sally" Brady (3 March 1909 – 4 May 2016), was the second oldest known living person in Northern Ireland.

Career 
Brady says he was always interested in politics and was always an Irish republican so it was an obvious progression for him to be selected to contest the Newry and Armagh Assembly seat in 2007 for Sinn Féin. He first took his seat in the Northern Ireland Assembly on 8 March 2007 and retained the seat in 2011. He was selected to contest the 2015 general election by party members in Newry and won the seat. He does not take his seat in the House of Commons of the United Kingdom, in line with Sinn Féin's abstentionist policy.

Locally, Brady is also a member of the Confederation of Community Groups and a member of the Board of Governors for schools in his constituency.

On 4 May 2015, during his Westminster election campaign, Brady was told by the Police Service of Northern Ireland (PSNI) of a death threat against him. During the early hours of the following morning, he was advised again of another death threat against him and a bomb threat on his family home in Newry. The PSNI searched the property and found no devices.

On 8 June 2017, Brady was re-selected by Sinn Féin in the Newry & Armagh constituency to defend his Westminster seat at the snap 2017 United Kingdom general election.

Brady successfully defended his seat again at the 2019 general election on 12 December 2019.

References

External links
Profile, agendani.com

1950 births
Living people
People from Newry
Sinn Féin MLAs
Northern Ireland MLAs 2007–2011
Northern Ireland MLAs 2011–2016
Members of the Parliament of the United Kingdom for Newry and Armagh (since 1983)
Sinn Féin MPs (post-1921)
UK MPs 2015–2017
UK MPs 2017–2019
UK MPs 2019–present
Sinn Féin councillors in Northern Ireland